EUniverCities

Partners
 Aveiro (University of Aveiro) 
 Exeter (University of Exeter) 
 Ghent (Ghent University) 
 Innsbruck (University of Innsbruck) 
 Lausanne (University of Lausanne) 
 Linköping (Linköping University) 
 Lublin (Maria Curie Sklodowska University - Lublin) 
 Magdeburg (Otto-von-Guericke University and University of Applied Sciences) 
 Malaga (University of Malaga)
 Norrköping (Linköping University – Campus Norrköping) 
 Parma (University of Parma) 
 Timisoara (West University of Timişoara)
 Trondheim (University of Science and Technology) 
 Turku (University of Turku and Åbo Akademi University).

References

External links 
 

Organizations established in 2012